Dempsey-Reynolds-Taylor House is a historic home located at Eden, Rockingham County, North Carolina.  The original section dates to the early-19th century, and consists of a two-story, Federal style frame block with an attached -story brick section.  It was enlarged by an Italianate / Queen Anne style main block added in the late-19th century.  Later additions to the house occurred in the 1920s.

It was listed on the National Register of Historic Places in 1983.

References

Houses on the National Register of Historic Places in North Carolina
Federal architecture in North Carolina
Italianate architecture in North Carolina
Queen Anne architecture in North Carolina
Houses in Rockingham County, North Carolina
National Register of Historic Places in Rockingham County, North Carolina